Aran Amassa (in Aranese: Aran Together) is a political party in the Val d'Aran founded in 2018. The party defines itself as a "left-wing alternative to the traditional two-party system in the Aran Valley. The majority of the members of Aran Amassa come from the Popular Unity Candidacy, Occitan Republican Left and United and Alternative Left.

History
The party gained 4 municipal councillors in the 2019 local elections, but failed to gain a seat in the General Council of Aran.

References

External links 
Website of Aran Amassa

Political parties in Val d'Aran
Socialist parties in Spain
Occitan nationalism
Pro-independence parties
Political parties in Catalonia
Secessionist organizations in Europe